Saša Papac (born 7 February 1980) is a Bosnian former professional footballer, who played as a left-back. Having started his career in his native country of Bosnia and Herzegovina  for Široki Brijeg, he went to play in Austria for Kärnten and Austria Wien, and in Scotland for Rangers. He spent the early part of his career as a central defender but during his six-year stint at Rangers developed into a left-back. He was capped 39 times for the Bosnia and Herzegovina national team.

Club career

Early career
Papac started his career with NK Široki Brijeg in the Premier League of Bosnia and Herzegovina in 2000. He made fourteen appearances, scoring once for the club.

He then moved to Austria with FC Kärnten a year later. Papac spent three years with Kärnten, making 100 appearances and scoring on three occasions. When Kärnten were relegated from the Austrian Bundesliga in 2004 he joined Austria Wien. Whilst in Vienna he would make 76 appearances (with three goals) and win the league in 2006. He was also part of the side which won successive Austrian Cups in 2005 and 2006.

Rangers
He signed for Rangers on 31 August 2006 for a fee of £450,000. He became Rangers' third signing from Austria Vienna in the 2006 summer transfer window, after Libor Sionko and Filip Šebo. Papac made his debut for Rangers on 17 September 2006, coming on as a half time substitute for Steven Smith in a Scottish Premier League game against Hibernian. The side went on to lose the match 2–1.

With the arrival of Walter Smith in January 2007, Papac lost his place in the first team. He struggled to get into the side, making only one appearance in over two months, but returned towards the end of the season on the left side of defence. He was linked with a move to French club Saint-Etienne in the summer but rejected it in order to claim a first-team spot.

In the 2007–08 season Papac was a regular at left-back and played in the Scottish Cup, League Cup and UEFA Cup finals. Papac netted his first goal for Rangers on his 83rd appearance for the club, during a league match against Dundee United on 4 November 2008. He signed a two-year contract extension in November 2008 that would keep him at the club until the summer of 2011. In season 2008–09, Papac made 39 appearances and won both the League and Scottish Cup. Papac made 46 appearances the following season and won the League for the second consecutive time along with the League Cup.

On 17 May 2011, Papac signed a new one-year contract extension with Rangers just two days after helping the club to a third consecutive championship. In August 2011, it was announced that Papac would miss about a month of the footballing season after suffering from a bout of pneumonia.

On 4 May 2012, Papac announced that he would be leaving Rangers at the end of the current footballing season.

Retirement
On 28 August 2012, Papac announced his retirement from professional football for health reasons, after failing to recover properly from a groin injury.

International career
 
Papac made his debut on 12 January 2001, against Bangladesh at the Sahara Millennium Cup but quit in March 2007, citing problems with the staff at the Bosnian FA. He played his last match versus Greece before quitting the national team in October 2006.
In January 2008, he decided to return to the international set-up under new boss Meho Kodro. Shortly after Kodro's dismissal, he was called up by new coach Miroslav Blažević but refused to come and retired from international football claiming it was to give space to new young players. However, in 2010 it emerged that Papac could make a return to the national team. In June 2011, Glasgow newspaper The Herald reported Papac was returning to international football.

On 1 July 2011, Papac confirmed that he will return to play for the national team. His final international was a February 2012 friendly match against Brazil.

In 2015, he was hired as a scout for the Bosnian national team.

Managerial career
On 15 November 2017, Papac was announced as new director of football of Željezničar Sarajevo. He did not want to extend his contract and announced on 27 May 2018 that when his contract expires on 1 June 2018, he will leave the position which he did. He thanked the club on the opportunity and wished it good luck in its future.

Career statistics

Club

Honours

Player
Austria Vienna
Austrian Bundesliga: 2005–06
Austrian Cup: 2004–05, 2005–06

Rangers
Scottish Premier League: 2008–09, 2009–10, 2010–11
Scottish Cup: 2007–08, 2008–09
Scottish League Cup: 2007–08, 2009–10, 2010–11
UEFA Cup runner-up: 2007–08

References

External links

1980 births
Living people
Sportspeople from Mostar
Croats of Bosnia and Herzegovina
Association football defenders
Bosnia and Herzegovina footballers
Bosnia and Herzegovina international footballers
NK Široki Brijeg players
FC Kärnten players
FK Austria Wien players
Rangers F.C. players
Premier League of Bosnia and Herzegovina players
Austrian Football Bundesliga players
Scottish Premier League players
Bosnia and Herzegovina expatriate footballers
Expatriate footballers in Austria
Bosnia and Herzegovina expatriate sportspeople in Austria
Expatriate footballers in Scotland
Bosnia and Herzegovina expatriate sportspeople in Scotland